The 2018 Tyrepower Tasmania SuperSprint was a motor racing event for the Supercars Championship, held on the weekend of 6 to 8 April 2018. The event was held at Symmons Plains Raceway in Launceston, Tasmania, and was scheduled to consist of one race of 120 kilometres and one race of 200 kilometres in length. It was the third event of sixteen in the 2018 Supercars Championship and hosted Races 7 and 8 of the season. The event was the 46th running of the Tasmania SuperSprint.

Report

Background 

Shane van Gisbergen of Triple Eight Race Engineering entered the event as the championship leader, 49 points ahead of Erebus Motorsport's David Reynolds and 61 points ahead of DJR Team Penske's Scott McLaughlin.

The event would see the introduction of a new qualifying format. Similar to MotoGP, there will be three sessions. The fastest ten drivers across the Friday practice sessions will get a bye into the second stage, with the other sixteen drivers required to go through Q1. The fastest six will join the other ten for Q2, with the other ten already having set their starting positions. Q2 will see the top ten advance to Q3, with the slowest six confirming their starting positions. Q3 will see the top ten drivers fight for pole position.

Results

Practice

Race 7

Qualifying

Race

 Notes
 – Cameron Waters received a 15-second post-race Time Penalty for Careless Driving, making contact with James Golding.

Championship standings after Race 7 

Drivers Championship

Teams Championship

 Note: Only the top five positions are included for both sets of standings.

Race 8

Qualifying

Race 

 Notes
 – Michael Caruso received a 15-second post-race Time Penalty for Careless Driving, causing contact with Will Davison.

Championship standings after Race 8 

Drivers Championship

Teams Championship

 Note: Only the top five positions are included for both sets of standings.

References 

Tasmania SuperSprint
Motorsport in Tasmania
Tasmania SuperSprint